Elys Saguil-Ventura (born 20 June 2001) is a New Zealand tennis player.

Ventura has a career high ITF junior combined ranking of 396 achieved in April 2019.

Ventura made her WTA main draw debut at the 2019 ASB Classic in the doubles draw partnering Valentina Ivanov.

External links
 
 

2001 births
Living people
New Zealand female tennis players
21st-century New Zealand women